Niblo is a surname. Notable people with the surname include:

Allan Niblo (born 1964), British film producer and director
Fred Niblo (1874–1948), American pioneer film actor, director and producer
Fred Niblo Jr. (1903–1973), American screenwriter
Tom Niblo (1877–1933), Scottish footballer 
William Niblo (1790–1878), Irish-born American theatre owner